The members of the 35th General Assembly of Newfoundland were elected in the Newfoundland general election held in October 1971. The votes were evenly divided between the Liberal Party and the Progressive Conservatives.

The election resulted in a hung parliament where neither party was able to form a stable government.

There was one session of the 35th General Assembly:

Ewart John Arlington Harnum served as lieutenant governor of Newfoundland.

Members of the Assembly 
The following members were elected to the assembly in 1971:

Notes:

By-elections 
None

References 

Terms of the General Assembly of Newfoundland and Labrador